Carabias is a village which belong to the municipality of Sigüenza, in the province of Guadalajara in Castile–La Mancha, Spain. It has a fixed population of eight inhabitants, a number which increases substantially during holidays and weekends.

Amongst its most notable attractions are the Iglesia del Salvador, a church built in the romanic style, dating from the 18th century and the neoclassical fountain situated in front of the church.

Sigüenza
Populated places in the Province of Guadalajara